The Battle of Siemiatycze was one of the largest battles of the January Uprising. It took place on February 6–7, 1863, in the town of Siemiatycze, Russian Empire (now Poland). Russian forces of some 2,500 under General Zachar Maniukin clashed with 4,000 Polish insurgents commanded by Walenty Lewandowski, Roman Roginski and Wladyslaw Cichorski-Zameczek. The battle was won by the Russians, and their victory had widespread implications in the area of Białystok, as local population decided not to back the uprising.

Siemiatycze, located in Grodno Governorate, was one of centers of Polish patriotic movement in 1860 – 1862. For unknown reasons, in 1862 a Russian garrison was withdrawn from the town, which allow Polish conspirators to act freely. The insurgents held their meetings in the palace of Duchess Anna Jablonowska, which also served as a storage of weapons, uniforms and food. The uprising itself did not begin here on January 22, 1863, but a few days later, when news of it reached the town.

Due to lack of Russian garrison, insurgents from whole area began to gather in Siemiatycze in early February. First unit to arrive here was led by Wladyslaw Cichorski-Zameczek, and it had volunteers from the area of Łomża. Soon afterwards it was joined by a unit under Roman Roginski, which came from the nearby village of Biala Podlaska. Both units merged under leadership of Walenty Lewandowski, the military commander (naczelnik) of the uprising in the region of Podlasie.

The battle lasted for two days, and began with a Russian assault on Polish positions. Polish kosynierzy managed to stop the Cossacks, with heavy losses on both sides. On the next day, Russian reinforcements arrived and Polish insurgents, facing supreme firepower of the enemy, had to retreat. The Cossacks entered Siemiatycze on February 7, and the insurgents fled either to Congress Poland, or Bialowieza Forest.

Altogether some 200 Poles were killed in the battle, while Russians lost some 70 soldiers. Siemiatycze, with its mostly wooden houses, was completely burned, and its residents had to flee to the nearby forests. Consequences of Polish defeat were widespread, as the uprising lost its momentum in the region of Podlasie, and failed to attract local masses.

Sources 
 Jan Buraczynski, Roztocze. Dzieje osadnictwa, Lublin 2008, s. 346–347, .
 Stefan Kieniewicz: Powstanie styczniowe. Warszawa: Państwowe Wydawnictwo Naukowe, 1983. .

Siemiatycze
1863 in Poland
Siemiatycze
February 1863 events
Grodno Governorate